António Francisco de Jesus Moreira (born 3 February 1939) is a former Portuguese professional footballer.

Career statistics

Club

Notes

References

1939 births
Living people
Portuguese footballers
Association football midfielders
Primeira Liga players
S.L. Benfica footballers
Atlético Clube de Portugal players
Vitória S.C. players